VFTS may stand for:

 VLT FLAMES Tarantula Survey of massive stars in the Tarantula Nebula
 Views (album), Originally titled Views From The Six
 Lada VFTS - a rally car based on Lada 2105